Orpheus Winds is the faculty woodwind quintet at Brigham Young University (BYU).

History
Orpheus Winds was formed in the 1970s at Brigham Young University by one of its charter members, Glenn Willams, a BYU music professor.  The ensemble is one of the most renowned woodwind quintets in Western North America. The ensemble performs nationally and internationally including tours in Canada, the United Kingdom, Mexico, and Brazil. They regularly perform at BYU in the Franklin S. Harris Fine Arts Center. The ensemble does not have a director and members of the ensemble choose pieces of music to perform.

Members
The members include professors at the BYU School of Music April Clayton (flute), Geralyn Giovannetti (oboe), Brian Blanchard (horn), Jaren Hinckley (clarinet), Christian Smith (bassoon).

Sources

External links
Encore Arts Management entry on Orpheus Winds

American classical music groups
Brigham Young University
Musical groups established in the 1970s
Musical groups from Utah
University musical groups
Wind quintets
1970s establishments in Utah
Harold B. Lee Library-related University Archives articles